Butonitazene is a benzimidazole derivative with opioid effects, which has been sold over the internet as a designer drug. It has relatively low potency compared to many related compounds, and has generally been encountered as a component of mixtures with other substances rather than in its pure form. However, it is still several times the potency of morphine and has been implicated in several cases of drug overdose. Butonitazene is a Schedule I drug in the USA, along with several related compounds.

See also 
 Etonitazene
 Isotonitazene
 Metonitazene
 Protonitazene

References 

Analgesics
Designer drugs
Benzimidazole opioids
Nitro compounds
Ethers
Tertiary amines